Ivan Žugčić (born 22 May 1958) is a retired Croatian football defender.

References

External links
 

1958 births
Living people
Association football defenders
Yugoslav footballers
VfL Bochum players
SG Wattenscheid 09 players
2. Bundesliga players
Bundesliga players
Yugoslav expatriate footballers
Expatriate footballers in West Germany
Yugoslav expatriate sportspeople in West Germany